Igor Makovetsky (born 29 February 1984) is a Belarusian speed skater. He competed in two events at the 2002 Winter Olympics.

References

1984 births
Living people
Belarusian male speed skaters
Olympic speed skaters of Belarus
Speed skaters at the 2002 Winter Olympics
Sportspeople from Minsk